Extreme Speed Motorsports was an American auto racing team based out of Riviera Beach, Florida. Founded by Scott Sharp and Patrón CEO Ed Brown, the team competed in the FIA World Endurance Championship, Tudor United SportsCar Championship, and American Le Mans Series since 2010 until 2018 when the team sold its equipment and race cars and shut down following an exhaustive sponsor search after the withdrawal of Patrón.

American Le Mans Series 
The Extreme Speed Motorsports team first entered the American Le Mans Series with two Ferrari F430 GTCs in 2010. The pair of Scott Sharp and Johannes van Overbeek managed a second-place finish at the season ending Petit Le Mans, finishing tenth in the Drivers' Championship with teammates Ed Brown and Guy Cosmo finishing thirteenth and landing fifth in the GT class Teams' Championship.

The team received two new Ferrari 458 GTEs for their second year of ALMS competition. 2011 season would prove to be a difficult season for the team with the #02 car failing to finish at several races. The team's best result came at penultimate race at Mazda Raceway Laguna Seca with a third-place finish for the #01 car. Sharp and Van Overbeek would finish the season seventh in the GT Drivers' Championship with the team landing sixth in the Teams' Championship.

2012 would be the most successful season yet for the team and its Ferraris. The #01 car of Sharp and van Overbeek was awarded a victory after a post race technical inspection disqualified the #45 Flying Lizard Motorsports Porsche at Mosport and earned another hard-fought win at the season finale Petit Le Mans. Scott Sharp and Johannes van Overbeek finished second in the GT Drivers' Championship with Ed Brown and Guy Cosmo fifteen and sixteen respectively. They would finish third in the GT Teams' Championship behind the factory efforts of BMW and Chevrolet.

2013 saw the team move up to the LMP2 class with two HPD ARX-03bs. 2013 would be the final season before the American Le Mans Series would merge with the Rolex Sports Car Series to form the Tudor United SportsCar Championship. Although 2013 was to be a preparation and development year for the team's new prototype machinery, the team fared well against their main rivals Level 5 Motorsports, claiming a win and second-place finish at Long Beach. The team finished the season second in the Teams' Championship with Scott Sharp second in the Drivers' Championship.

United SportsCar Championship 
The Extreme Speed Motorsports team entered the inaugural season of the Tudor United SportsCar Championship with a two car LMP2 effort in the premier prototype class. Scott Sharp and Ryan Dalziel would pilot the #1 HPD with Johannes van Overbeek and Ed Brown sharing the #2 car. IMSA's balance of performance left the LMP2 teams with a substantial gap in top speed to the much higher powered Daytona Prototypes throughout the entirety of the season, preventing the team from consistently competing for overall victories. Brown and Overbeek would claim a win victory at Mazda Raceway Laguna Seca, a track that favored the LMP2 cars' cornering speeds. The team withdrew the #1 car from the eleventh round to compete in the FIA World Endurance Championship race at the Circuit of the Americas, later deciding to withdraw both cars from the season ending Petit Le Mans to enter the Shanghai FIA WEC race in preparation for a 2015 campaign in the series

For the 2015 season, the ESM team originally committed to run the North American Endurance Championship rounds as a supplement to their FIA WEC campaign. However, after unsuccessful results at Daytona and Sebring, the team would not return to complete the rest of the North American season, choosing to focus its resources on the remainder of the WEC season.

In 2017, Tequila Patron ESM switched to Nissan engines, fielding two Nissan Onroak DPi units for Dalziel/Sharp and Van Overbeek/Brown. The pairing of Dalziel/Sharp would ultimately secure 5th in the drivers championship, while Brown would depart the team mid-season, and be replaced by Pipo Derani. The season was highlighted with 1 Pole Position at Watkins Glen, as well as 2 wins, at Road America, and at the season-ending Petit Le Mans.

In 2018, Tequila Patron ESM continued to run 2 Nissan-Onroak DPis, for Dalziel/Sharp , as well as Derani/Van Overbeek. The Season would be highlighted by 2 poles at Belle Isle, and at Road Atlanta, as well as winning the 12 Hours Of Sebring, and at Laguna Seca. However, due to the loss of title sponsor Patron, the team sold all its equipment and assets, and would ultimately close in December 2018.

WeatherTech SportsCar Championship wins

World Endurance Championship 

The team first entered the FIA World Endurance Championship with a single car at the 2014 6 Hours of Circuit of the Americas, earning a 3rd-place finish. The team then entered two cars in the 6 Hours of Shanghai claiming 2nd and 5th-place finishes. The two events would serve as preparation for a full season entry in 2015.

For the 2015 season, Extreme Speed Motorsports would commit to a full season FIA WEC effort. While originally planning to run the new HPD ARX-04b, testing issues meant HPD would delay the car's debut until the following season. ESM would instead use their ARX-03bs for the opening round at Silverstone, before switching to the Ligier JS P2 platform for the rest of the season.

References

External links 

 Official Website
 Patron Official Website

American Le Mans Series teams
American auto racing teams
FIA World Endurance Championship teams
Auto racing teams disestablished in 2018
WeatherTech SportsCar Championship teams
24 Hours of Le Mans teams
Auto racing teams established in 2010